Ōhau B is a power station operated by Meridian Energy in the South Island of New Zealand.

It is a twin station with Ōhau C and is part of the Waitaki hydro scheme which consists of eight power stations operated from a control centre near Twizel. Water from Lake Ruataniwha flows through Ōhau B, then Ōhau C and then through to Lake Benmore.

See also

Ōhau A
List of power stations in New Zealand
Electricity sector in New Zealand

References

Further reading

External links

Meridian Energy - power station information

Energy infrastructure completed in 1984
Hydroelectric power stations in New Zealand
Buildings and structures in Canterbury, New Zealand